Amir Hajjilu (also romanized as Amīr Ḩājjīlū; also known as Amir Hajloo and Amīr Ḩājlū) is a village in Qarah Bulaq Rural District, Sheshdeh and Qarah Bulaq District, Fasa County, Fars Province, Iran. At the 2006 census, its population was 3,728, in 848 families.

References 

Populated places in Fasa County